Delaware Municipal Airport "Jim Moore Field"  is a public airport located three miles (5 km) southwest of downtown Delaware, Ohio, United States. It is owned and operated by the City of Delaware.

Facilities and aircraft 
For the 12-month period ending August 31, 2007, the airport had 33,000 aircraft operations, an average of 108 per day: 92% general aviation and 8% air taxi.

The airport provides pilot lounge and public lounge in the main building.

References

External links 

Airports in Ohio
Buildings and structures in Delaware, Ohio